The Michael J. Hagan Arena (previously known as the Alumni Memorial Fieldhouse) of Saint Joseph's University is SJU's  home court for men's and women's basketball. The new arena seats 4,200, which is 1,000 more than the Alumni Memorial Fieldhouse seated. The renovation adds a concourse, larger offices and locker rooms, a Hall of Fame room, study rooms, basketball center, and practice facilities. 700 seats were added to the student section which puts the total at 1,700 and makes this part of the arena even more intimidating for opposing teams.

History

1949-2008 Alumni Memorial Fieldhouse
Alumni Memorial Fieldhouse was a 3,200-seat multi-purpose arena in Philadelphia, Pennsylvania. The arena, home to the Saint Joseph's University Hawks basketball opened in 1949 and was inaugurated on November 26 with a loss to the University of Rhode Island.  The first women's varsity home game was a loss to Immaculata University on January 17, 1974.  The building was dedicated to all college soldier-heroes on its dedication day, Veterans Day 1949.

In addition to serving as an arena for the basketball teams, Alumni Memorial Fieldhouse also contains locker rooms for students, faculty, and other varsity teams, an additional recreation room, squash courts, a swimming pool, and a weight room.

On October 26, 1967, the Reverend Dr. Martin Luther King Jr. spoke to 3,400 people in the Fieldhouse. Today, a bronze plaque in the lobby recognizes his visit.

The Hawks won 34 consecutive games in Alumni Memorial Fieldhouse from the late 1950s through the early 1960s. In the mid-1970s and '90s, the Fieldhouse served as the practice home for the Philadelphia 76ers. There were over 125 sellouts over the last 15 years the Fieldhouse was open.

The final game at the Fieldhouse was a win over #8 ranked Xavier University on March 5, 2008. The sell-out crowd included Hawk legends Jameer Nelson and Jack Ramsay.

2009 - Hagan Arena
During the 2007 season, it was announced that the Fieldhouse would be closed and transformed with a $25 million renovation project to provide a 21st-century facility for the quickly growing campus.

During renovations, the Saint Joseph's Hawks men's basketball team played its home games at the Palestra on the University of Pennsylvania's campus, while the women played on the campus of Philadelphia University.

The Fieldhouse underwent extensive renovations and additions, with many sections of the building being razed for expansion purposes.  Work began in the Fall of 2007. The final product of the project added 1,000 seats to the arena, as well as the addition of a new basketball center, concourse, entrance and lobby on 54th and Overbrook and concessions.

The arena was named after Michael Hagan, a 1985 graduate of Saint Joseph's and Washington Crossing resident who donated $10 million toward the project. The renovation is part of a larger project called With Faith and Strength To Dare: The Campaign For Saint Joseph's University.

Ramsay Basketball Center

The Hagan also includes the Ramsay Basketball Center, named after legendary coach Jack Ramsay, which is a two-story,  wing with locker rooms, offices, study space, conference rooms, and a Hall of Fame room.

The first game at Hagan was a win against Drexel University and the Hawks went 8–4 in the first season at Hagan.

Concerts & performers at Hagan
Ludacris
Jay Sean
Gin Blossoms
LMFAO
Keri Hilson
Nappy Roots
Mike Posner
Chingy
Lupe Fiasco
Macklemore
Mac Miller
Avenged Sevenfold
Volbeat
The Mighty Mighty Bosstones
The Four Seasons
Flo Rida

See also

 List of NCAA Division I basketball arenas

References

College basketball venues in the United States
Basketball venues in Philadelphia
Saint Joseph's Hawks basketball venues
West Philadelphia
Sports venues in Pennsylvania
Tennis venues in Pennsylvania
World TeamTennis stadiums
1949 establishments in Pennsylvania
Sports venues completed in 1949